Vesicle transport through interaction with t-SNAREs homolog 1A is a protein that in humans is encoded by the VTI1A gene.

The protein encoded by the VTI1A gene is a vesicular-SNARE (v-SNARE) protein which is located in the membranes of target vesicle compartments.

References

Further reading